is a former Japanese football player.

Playing career
Kazushi Uchida played for Fujieda MYFC from 2010 to 2015.

References

External links

1987 births
Living people
Takushoku University alumni
Association football people from Shizuoka Prefecture
Japanese footballers
J3 League players
Japan Football League players
Fujieda MYFC players
Association football defenders
21st-century Japanese people